Rotatin is a protein that in humans is encoded by the RTTN gene. It is involved in the maintenance of cellular cilia and the radial migration of neurons in the cerebral cortex.

Function 
Rotatin is involved in the maintenance of ciliary basal bodies. Mutations in rotatin result in fewer, abnormally short cilia, with bulbous tips and multiple basal bodies. It is also involved in the radial migration of neurons in the cerebral cortex and localises in similar areas to the migration-guiding Cajal–Retzius cells. Its other roles include arrangement of the heart loops in heart development.

Clinical significance 
Mutations in both copies of rotatin cause a syndrome of microcephaly, short stature and polymicrogyria with or without seizures.

History 
The gene was first characterised in 2002 and was given its name for its role in the axial migration of heart loop development.

References 

Human proteins